Assisted Living is a 2003 American comedy film directed and written by Elliot Greenebaum.  It depicts a day in the life of Todd, a janitor at an assisted living facility.  He befriends the residents, one of whom confuses him for her son.  Assisted Living won 4 awards at film festivals, including the Grand Jury Prize at the 2003 Slamdance Film Festival.

External links
 

2003 films
2003 comedy films
2000s English-language films
American comedy films
2000s American films